Patti Cathedral is a Roman Catholic cathedral in Patti, Sicily, Italy, dedicated to Saint Bartholomew.

It is the episcopal seat of the Diocese of Patti.

Roman Catholic cathedrals in Italy
Cathedrals in Sicily
Churches in the metropolitan city of Messina